August Friedrich Müller (15 December 16841 May 1761) was a German legal scholar and logician.

August Friedrich was born in Penig, the son of Johann Adam Müller and his wife Johanne Susanne, daughter of a pharmacist in Rochlitz, Johann Fromhold. Prefigured by his father, he attended school in 1697 and studied at the University of Leipzig from 1703. Here he completed a degree in early philosophical sciences; Andreas Rüdiger (1673–1731) was his most important teacher. On the side he studied law under Gottlieb Gerhard Titius (1661–1714).

In 1707 he received his degree of Magister in Leipzig, where he set up a school of philosophy. After a stay at the University of Erfurt, where on 8 October 1714 he received his doctorate in law, he returned to Leipzig, where he also lectured on law. A position was offered to him at the University of Halle but he became an associate professor of philosophy at the University of Leipzig in 1732, succeeding Christian Thomasius and his pupil, Andreas Rüdiger. He was Dean of Philosophy several times, first in 1736.  He died in Leipzig, aged 76.

Bach composed the cantata Zerreißet, zersprenget, zertrümmert die Gruft, BWV 205 in 1725 for the name day of Müller and performed the piece on the evening of 3 August 1725 in front of the professor's house at 2 Katharinenstraße in Leipzig.

Works 
 Diss. de arte loquendi. Leipzig 1708
 Diss. inaug. de rationibus legum investigandis; ad L. 20. 21 D. de LL. Erfurt 1714
 Diss. de fictionum iuris Romani usu antiquo, non-usu hodierno. Leipzig 1715
 Balthasar Graciaans Qracul, das man mit sich führen und stets bey der Hand haben kann, das ist: Kunst – Regeln der Klugheit, vormahls von Mr. Amelot de la Houffaye unter dem Titel l'Homme de Cour ins Französische, anietzo aber aus dem Spanischen Original, welches durch und durch hinzngefüget worden, ins Teutsche übersetzt und mit neuen Anmerkungen, in welchen die Maximen des Autoris aus den Principiis der Sitten-Lehre erklähret und beurtheilet werden, versehen. 1. Centurie. Leipzig 1716, 2. Centurie Leipzig 1717, 3. Centurie. Leipzig 1719, new edition Leipzig 1738 (2 volumes)
 Einleitung in die philosophischen Wissenschaften. 3 volumes. Leipzig 1728, 2nd edition Leipzig 1733
 Progr. inaug. sub aufpiciis Professionis philosophiae extraord. Leipzig 1731
 Progr. inaug. cum Professionem Organi Aristotelici capesseret. Leipzig 1732
 Diss. pro loco in facultate philosophica obtinendo de emigratione religionis caussa suscipienda. Leipzig 1732
 Progr. de argumentatione dialectica Aristoteli usitata. Leipzig 1736
 Progr. de Stoicorum Paradoxis. Leipzig 1736
 Progr. de notione legis. Leipzig 1740
 Progr. de successione hereditaria ex iure naturali. Leipzig 1743 Continuatio. Leipzig 1743
 Progr. de praemiis viris strennis a Platone decretis. Leipzig 1744
 Progr. de usucapione et praescriptione longi temporis ex principiis naturalibus. Leipzig 1744
 Progr. I et II de principio contradictionis. Leipzig 1746
 Progr. I et II de origine civitatum. Leipzig 1750
 Progr. de lectione librorum docta. Leipzig 1752
 Progr. de perceptione clara et distincta. Leipzig 1754
 Progr. I et II de notione legis naturalis detracta utilitatis ratione concepta. Leipzig 1758
 Progr. de libertate naturali et imperii humani limitibus. Leipzig 1760

References

German legal scholars
German logicians
1684 births
1761 deaths
Academic staff of Leipzig University
Leipzig University alumni
Jurists from Saxony
German philosophers
German male writers